Bwesigye bwa Mwesigire is a Ugandan writer and lawyer, and the co-founder of the Centre for African Cultural Excellence (CACE), the organisation that curates the pan-African Writivism literary initiative. He is the author of a chap book, "Fables out of Nyanja", and a monograph, "Finding Foot as an International Court; The Prospects and Challenges of the East African Court of Justice".

His work has appeared in literary journals, anthologies and academic publications, including the Chimurenga Chronic, Uganda Modern Literary Digest, Saraba magazine, New Black Magazine, AFLA Quarterly, the Kalahari Review, Short Story Day Africa, The Guardian, The World To Come and African Roar, among others. He is a regular contributor to the Africa-focused blogs: This is Africa and Africa in Words. In 2015 he was recognised by the Harry Frank Guggenheim Foundation as a Young African Scholar and selected for the prestigious African Leadership Centre Peace and Security Fellowship for African scholars at King's College, London.

Early life and education
Bwesigye was born in Kabale Hospital and grew up in Nyanja, in south-western Uganda, close to the border with Rwanda. He grew up with his mother, a teacher, at the staff quarters of the school where she taught. Bwesigye holds an LLB degree from Makerere University. He has in the past taught Human Rights at Makerere University and Uganda Martyrs University and Law at Busoga University, St. Augustine International University and Uganda Christian University.

His youth work has been recognised by the Konrad Adenaur Stiftung Youth Policy Think Tank for Policy Alternatives, British Council Global Change-makers, Harambe Entrepreneur Alliance, the United States Mission to Uganda Youth Advisors to Washington, Generation Change Uganda Chapter, the Mandela Institute for Development Studies and the Do School Theater Fellowship.

Published works

Monograph

Chap book

Short stories
"Europe is not a country" in, 
"Through the same gate" in, 
"Less is more", in The Kalahari review 2013
"The goat and the meat", in Saraba, 2013
"Spoiled town boy", in The New black magazine, 2012

References

External links 
"Bwesigye bwa Mwesigire On Writivism: Promoting Literature by Africans to Africans on the Continent"
"BOOKS THEY READ: Brian Bwesigye, PGDA student"
"Bwesigye, author of "Fables out of Nyanja"
"Producing and Consuming African Literature: Ernest Bazanye and the Uganda Case"
"Observer-backed Writivism returns "
"‘Aid is killing African literature’"

Living people
Ugandan writers
Makerere University alumni
1987 births
21st-century Ugandan lawyers
People from Kabale District
Academic staff of Makerere University